Samuel Segev (15 April 1926 - 9 August 2012) was an Israeli journalist and author. A long-term writer for Maariv, he also wrote for the Canadian Winnipeg Free Press, and was a visiting professor at Hofstra University.

Books
 The Iranian Triangle: The Untold Story of Israel’s Role in the Iran-Contra Affair, Free Press, 1988, on the Iran-Contra Affair
 Crossing the Jordan, Israel's Hard Road to Peace, St. Martin's Press, 1998. 
 The Moroccan Connection: The secret ties between Israel and Morocco, Matar Books, 2008 (in Hebrew).
 Eli Cohen, Alone in Damascus (2012), on Israeli spy Eli Cohen

References

External links
 Winnipeg Free Press columns
 Chapter One of Crossing the Jordan, Israel's Hard Road to Peace

1926 births
2012 deaths
Israeli journalists
Hofstra University faculty
Israeli people wounded in the 1947–1949 Palestine war